Logodazh is a village in Blagoevgrad Municipality, in Blagoevgrad Province, Bulgaria. It is situated in the foothills of Vlahina mountain on the road between Blagoevgrad and Delčevo, North Macedonia. Between 1959 and 1993 the village was named Stanke Lisichkovo to a partizan from the village. There is a winery "Vinprom Logodazh" with vineyards working in Logodazh.

References

Villages in Blagoevgrad Province